Arthur Hubert Terry (17 February 1927 – 24 January 2004) was an English philologist, critic and translator, who was an expert in Catalan literature, and one of the best experts on Joan Maragall. He was Professor of Spanish at Queen's University Belfast (1962–73) and Professor of Literature at the University of Essex (1973–93).

Biography
Terry was born in York in 1927 and studied at Saint Peter's school in the same city. In 1947 he got his philology degree at the University of Cambridge, where he was pupil of J. B.Trend. He came to Barcelona for the first time in 1949 through a grant in order to study early Catalan monasticism. From 1950 until 1972 he taught Hispanic languages and literatures at the Queen's University Belfast, where he was professor from 1962 until 1973 (succeeding Ignacio González-Llubera). Then he was appointed literature professor at the University of Essex in 1973; he remained in the chair until retirement in 1993. In 1976 he published an anthology of Ausiàs March's poems with English translations and coordinated a series of essays about Tirant lo Blanc. He was a great expert in modern Catalan poetry, and also in Spanish poetry. His study about Antonio Machado's Campos de Castilla in 1973 must be pointed out. His translations into English from Joan Brossa and Gabriel Ferrater must also be pointed out.

Awards 
He was president of the Anglo-Catalan Society from 1962 to 1965 and from the International Assotiation of Catalan Language and Literature from 1982 to 1988. In 1982 he received the Creu de Sant Jordi Award, in 1995 he received the Ramon Llull International Prize and in 2001 the Serra d'Or Critics Prize.

Works 
 La poesia de Joan Maragall (1963). 
 An Anthology of Spanish Poetry 1500-1700 (1968).
 Catalan Literature (1972). 
 Quatre poetes catalans. Ferrater, Brossa, Gimferrer, Xirau (1992). 
 Modern Catalan Poetry: A European Perspective (1991).
 Readings of J.V. Foix: An Anthology (1998).
 Three Fifteenth-century Valencian Poets (2000).
 La idea del lenguaje en la poesía española: Crespo Sánchez Robayna y Valente (2002). 
 A Companion to Catalan Literature (2003).

References

External links 
 Arthur Terry on the Association of Catalan Language Writers website. 
 Arthur Terry's obituary in The Independent

1927 births
2004 deaths
English philologists
Linguists from the United Kingdom
English translators
British Hispanists
People educated at St Peter's School, York
Alumni of the University of Cambridge
Academics of Queen's University Belfast
Academics of the University of Essex
English male non-fiction writers
20th-century philologists
20th-century British translators
20th-century English writers
21st-century philologists
21st-century British translators
21st-century English writers
Spanish–English translators
Catalan–English translators
20th-century English male writers
20th-century linguists